Pristigaster is a small genus of ray-finned fish belonging to the family Pristigasteridae. It contains two species, both restricted to the Amazon Basin in South America.

Species
 Pristigaster cayana Cuvier, 1829 (Amazon hatchet herring)
 Pristigaster whiteheadi Menezes & de Pinna, 2000

References
 

Pristigasteridae
Fish of South America
Ray-finned fish genera
Freshwater fish genera
Taxa named by Georges Cuvier